Hinapia (abbreviated from Hi New Amazing Utopia; stylized in all caps) was a South Korean girl group formed by OSR Entertainment. The group was composed of five members: Minkyeung, Yaebin, Gyeongwon, Eunwoo, and Bada. Hinapia debuted on November 3, 2019 with the single album New Start. Hinapia disbanded on August 21, 2020.

History

Pre-debut
Minkyeung, Yaebin, Gyeongwon, and Eunwoo previously debuted as members of the girl group Pristin under Pledis Entertainment on March 21, 2017 with the extended play Hi! Pristin. Following their sophomore release titled Schxxl Out and a subgroup named Pristin V, which included Minkyeung, Yaebin, and Eunwoo, the group disbanded on May 24, 2019 after a prolonged hiatus. On October 21, 2019, the aforementioned members were announced to be re-debuting under AlSeulBit Entertainment, which was renamed OSR Entertainment shortly after, alongside an additional member named Bada. On October 24, the group was revealed to be named Hinapia, which is an abbreviation of "Hi New Amazing Utopia".

2019: Debut with New Start 
Hinapia performed their debut single "Drip" prior to its release on the music program Show Champion during its October 30, 2019 broadcast. The group formally released the single on November 3, 2019 as the lead single of the single album titled New Start. A showcase for the album titled Pursuit of a New Utopia was held the following day. "Drip" debuted and peaked at number 18 on the World Digital Songs Sales chart issued on November 16, 2019, making Hinapia the eleventh South Korean girl group to appear on the chart with their debut single. The group was subsequently nominated for Best Super Rookie at the 2019 K-Champ Awards.

2020: Disbandment 

On February 2, 2020, it had been reported that Hinapia were aiming to release their sophomore album sometime in early 2020, in which the group will showcase "a more mature look than before". On August 21, 2020, however, OSR Entertainment announced that the group had disbanded and that the members had their contracts terminated.

Members 
 Minkyeung (Korean: 민경) — leader
 Gyeongwon (경원)
 Eunwoo (은우)
 Yaebin (예빈)
 Bada (바다)

Discography

Singles

Filmography

Reality shows

Awards and nominations

K-Champ Awards

References 

K-pop music groups
South Korean girl groups
South Korean dance music groups
Musical groups from Seoul
Musical groups established in 2019
2019 establishments in South Korea
South Korean pop music groups
Musical groups disestablished in 2020